The 2018–19 Harvard Crimson men's basketball team represented Harvard University in the 2018–19 NCAA Division I men's basketball season. They played their home games at the Lavietes Pavilion in Boston, Massachusetts and were led by 12th-year head coach Tommy Amaker. They finished the season 19-12, 10-4 to tie for first place. As the No. 1 seed in the Ivy Tournament, they defeated Penn in the semifinals before losing to Yale in the final. They received an automatic bid to the NIT where they defeated Georgetown in the first round before losing in the second round to NC State.

Previous season
The Crimson finished the 2017–18 season 18–14, 12–2 in Ivy League play to share the Ivy League regular season championship with Penn. As the No. 1 seed in the Ivy League tournament, they defeated Cornell in the semifinals before losing to Penn in the championship game. As a regular season league champion, and No. 1 seed in their league tournament, who failed to win their league tournament, they received an automatic bid to the National Invitation Tournament, where they lost in the first round to Marquette.

Roster

Schedule and results

|-
!colspan=12 style=| Regular season

|-
!colspan=12 style=| Ivy League tournament
|-

|-
!colspan=9 style=| National Invitation tournament

|-

Source

References

Harvard Crimson men's basketball seasons
Harvard Crimson
Harvard Crimson men's basketball team
Harvard Crimson men's basketball team
Harvard
Harvard Crimson men's basketball
Harvard Crimson men's basketball